Baker is an unincorporated community and census-designated place in Clay County, Minnesota, United States. It lies roughly halfway between the cities of Sabin and Barnesville. As of the 2020 census, its population was 45.

Demographics

History
Baker, a railway village was named for Lester H. Baker, a farmer who moved on to the state of Washington. The village was first settled in 1879, and the Great Northern Railway came in 1880. The first building was built in 1883 by John Erikson to store grain. The railroad in 1903 requested that the post office name be changed from Navan to Baker, to honor Lester Baker.

References

Census-designated places in Clay County, Minnesota
Census-designated places in Minnesota